Seiko is a brand name for Japanese clock and watch company Seiko Holdings Corporation.

Seiko may also refer to:

Organizations
Seiko Group, a Japanese corporate group consisting of three independent companies including 
Seiko Holding Corporation
Seiko Instruments
Seiko Epson
Seiko Films, a movie outfit in the Philippines
Seiko SA, a defunct football club in Hong Kong

Other uses
 Seiko (given name), a name and a list of people with the name
 Seiko (album), a 1990 album by Seiko Matsuda